Wadhams is a surname. Notable people with the surname include:

Dick Wadhams (born 1955), Republican political consultant
Edgar Philip Prindle Wadhams, the first bishop of the Roman Catholic Diocese of Ogdensburg
Peter Wadhams, professor of Ocean Physics, Head of the Polar Ocean Physics Group in the University of Cambridge

Wadham is also a surname. Notable people with the surname include:
Amber Wadham (born 1996), Australian internet personality, also known as Paladin Amber
Dorothy Wadham (1534/35 – 1618), wife of Nicholas, co-founder of Wadham College, Oxford
Jemma Wadham, contemporary glacial biochemist
Nicholas Wadham (1531/32 – 1609), co-founder of Wadham College, Oxford
William Wadham (Australian politician) (–1895), politician in South Australia
William Wadham (died 1452), High Sheriff of Devon, England
William Joseph Wadham (1863–1950), English painter in Australia